Austrian euro coins have a unique design for each denomination, with a common theme for each of the three series of coins. The minor coins feature Austrian flowers, the middle coins examples of architecture from Austria's capital, Vienna, and the two major coins famous Austrians. All designs are by the hand of Josef Kaiser and also include the 12 stars of the EU, Flag of Austria and the year of imprint.

Austrian euro design
Prior to 2008, the old common side showing national borders was used, but from the 2008 coins use the new common side without borders. For images of the common side and a detailed description of the coins, see euro coins. Austria is the only country which uses the Latin alphabet and yet, repeats the denomination on the national side of the coins, thus not adhering to the rule.

From 2017 (5 cent coins) and 2018 (2 and 1 cent coins) onwards, the design of the national side has been slightly altered, decreasing the thickness and increasing the number of stripes representing the red fields of the Austrian flag.

Circulating Mintage quantities
The following table shows the mintage quantity for all Austrian euro coins, per denomination, per year.

Austrian proof set

Each year the Austrian Mint issues a limited edition of its Euro coins in proof quality.

€2 commemorative coins

Other commemorative coins (Collector's coins)

Austria has a large collection of euro commemorative coins, mainly in Silver and Gold, but they also use other materials (like Niobium for example).  Their face value range from 5 euro to 100 euro.  This is mainly done as a legacy of old national practice of minting Gold and Silver coins.  These coins are not really intended to be used as means of payment, so generally they do not circulate.  Here are some samples:

References

External links

European Central Bank – Austria
 Oesterreichische National Bank (Austrian Central Bank)
 The Austrian Mint 
 Austrian euro coins and commemorative 2€ coins

Euro coins by issuing country
Euro coins
Euro